Dolev is an Israeli settlement organized as a community settlement in the West Bank.

Israeli settlements in the West Bank are widely considered to be illegal under international law, but the Israeli government disputes this.

History
Dolev was established in 1983, by five families who moved to the site on the festival of  Sukkot. It is named for nearby Nahal Dolev where dolev trees  (Platanus orientalis) grow. According to ARIJ, the land was confiscated from three Palestinian villages: 

 867 dunams (0.867 km²) from Al-Janiya,
 157 dunams (0.157 km²) from Ein Qiniya,
 22 dunams (0.022 km²) from Deir Ibzi, including spring Ein Bubin for irrigation projects.'This Place Is Only for Jews': The West Bank's Apartheid Springs, by Gideon Levy and Alex Levac,  Aug 29, 2019, Haaretz

In 1988, Ulpanat Dolev girls school established a youth rehabilitation program, Dolev Homes for Youth at Risk, which now has branches in Ashdod and Modi'in. In 2013, 450 girls from all over Israel were enrolled in the program. Dolev Homes received the National Award for Excellence in Education for its contribution to Israeli society over a period of 25 years.

On Monday 26 August 2019, Prime Minister Binyamin Netanyahu directed the Director General of the Prime Minister’s Office to submit for Planning Committee approval at its next meeting, plans for the establishment of a new neighborhood in Dolev, near the Ein Bubin spring after the murder of Rina Shnerb. The new settlement will include approximately 300 new housing units, according to the plans drawn up by the Prime Minister’s Office. On 27 August 2019 it was decided that the new settlement of three hundred homes to be built in Dolev, would be named after Rina Shnerb.

Notable residents
Moti Yogev (b. 1956), Israeli politician (The Jewish Home)
David Mintz (b. 1959), Israeli judge (Supreme Court of Israel)

References

External links
Dolev Mateh Binyamin Regional Council 

Community settlements
Israeli settlements in the West Bank
Populated places established in 1983
Mateh Binyamin Regional Council
1983 establishments in the Palestinian territories